The All-Union Central Council of Trade Unions (ACCTU; , VTsSPS) was the  national trade union federation of the Soviet Union.

The federation was established in January 1918.  In October 1990, it was dissolved, and replaced by the General Confederation of Trade Unions of the USSR.

History

Precursors
In 1905, First All Russian Conference of Trade Unions was held. In 1906,Second All Russian Conference of Trade Unions was held.In 1917,Third All-Russian Conference of Trade Unions was held.In 1918,Fourth All Russian Conference of Trade Unions was held.

Affiliates

Presidents
1918: Grigory Zinoviev
1918: Mikhail Tomsky
1929: Alexander Dogadov
1930: Nikolai Shvernik
1944: Vasili Kuznetsov
1953: Nikolai Shvernik
1956: Viktor Grishin
1967: Alexander Shelepin
1976: Alexei Shibaev
1982: Stepan Shalaev
1990: Gennady Yanayev

References

Trade unions established in 1918
Trade unions disestablished in 1990
Trade unions in the Soviet Union